Mario Ibáñez (27 July 1921 – 25 November 2004) was a Chilean footballer. He played in one match for the Chile national football team in 1942. He was also part of Chile's squad for the 1942 South American Championship.

References

External links
 

1921 births
2004 deaths
Chilean footballers
Chile international footballers
Association football goalkeepers
Universidad de Chile footballers